Sol Goode is a 2001 American romantic comedy film written and directed by Danny Comden. The lead role of Sol Goode is played by Balthazar Getty; other cast include Katharine Towne, Jamie Kennedy, Danny Comden, and Cheri Oteri. The film features cameo appearances including Jared Leto, Carmen Electra, Jason Bateman, and Shannon Leto.

Plot
Sol Goode is a well meaning but carousing and freeloading slacker who lives in Los Angeles. Heading towards his 30s, Sol aims to become an actor and to hit it big in Hollywood, but like many others, he has not been able to catch a break or a role in anything. Outside of acting, Sol's socializing has made him both somewhat famous around guys and infamous amongst women in LA, for his larger than life party wild ways with the former and constant one night stands with the latter. He lives in an uptown bungalow with his friend and roommate Justin, and the constant crew of friends in his life consists of the working and consummate Justin, Cooper; a slick playboy (and possible metrosexual in the closet), Happy; his easygoing drifting well-endowed cowboy cousin who comes into town now and then; and Chloe, his only female best friend who works as a waitress and attends college. 

After a one night stand with Tammie, a "low end" girl in the social scene, Sol realizes he has run out of money to pay his share of the rent, and Justin has to reprimand him for not having a job and the possibility that he will have to grow up. Sol's situation is further compounded when visiting his parents, who give him a "sit down", confronting him about his lack of responsibility, all while refusing to issue him rent money. At work, Justin is singled out for a promotion from mail room duty, to become the assistant of the bossy and snappy female Hollywood agent Bernie "Best", and his off hours are devoted to his controlling and manipulative fiancee, Brenda. 

One day, Happy comes into town to see Sol, stating that his time off is thanks to he and his lover taking time off from their relationship, something that Sol refers to as "a hall pass". When Happy comes along with Sol for an audition, Sol's agent proceeds to hire Happy for a Levi Jeans commercial and drops Sol behind his back. At the end of his rope with this turn of events, his rent due and eviction nearing, and his car being towed away, Sol again turns to trying to pull a one night stand to ease his frustrations, but is forced to hitch with Tammy when no other options are available. Meanwhile, Justin is forced to perform demeaning and menial tasks as Bernie's assistant and endure the brunt of her abuse, from picking up the feces of Bernie's dog, being the receiving end of her verbal abuse, forced to run incredibly petty errands for her, and put into high pressure jobs that test his patience. During a day out with his friends, Brenda reveals she wants Justin to move in with her, and issues a reluctant Justin the ultimatum of choosing time with his friends or her.

The morning after, Tammy confronts Sol about how she is called for nothing but sex between them, and implores and coerces Sol into taking her out on a date. Hoping to take her out to a restaurant in the San Fernando Valley to avoid being seen with her in public, and with his car impounded, Sol is driven by Tammy on their night out, and his plans are dashed when Tammy is to work as a Red Bull promoter at a live MTV event before their date and is caught by one of the girls he knows out on the road. The date turns out to be a very awkward affair that ends with Tammy being the one wanting to engage in a purely sexual relationship with Sol, and perturbed, Sol ditches her when she awaits for him in the women's bathroom. During a night out afterwards, Sol sees Chloe share drinks with Happy on a date, while Justin gets drunk and engages with a fling with an old acquaintance, both of them discussing Brenda's notorious reputation. The next day, Sol confronts Happy about Chloe, whom the latter can tell that Sol has deeper feelings for, while Justin is caught in bed by Brenda. Unable to state anything but how the fling "just naturally happened", Brenda bitterly breaks off the engagement, which Justin indifferently lets pass on.

With the awkward date shaking him up and getting to realize how unstable things are, Sol attempts to get his life in order. He applies for numerous jobs at a placement center, from golf range tender, paperboy, and even out of his agent's "mercy", a sewage maintenance worker, but none are anything he can stand or be competent in. Sol then invites Chloe to their hangout spot, and confesses how they are both everything they are looking for in love, but despite him realizing the signs this time around, Chloe's reception is mixed due to his initial boundaries that she is just to strictly be "a friend" and how she is still in a relationship with Happy, leaving their future together uncertain. Justin meanwhile gains the confidence to stand up to Bernie, which has her reveal that her tempestuous attitude and demeaning tasks were meant to test him to see if he had what it took to be an agent, which he passed. Despite being offered another promotion, Justin actually quits, having had enough of the corporate world's hazing and cruel workplace antics. 

The next day, Justin reveals to Sol that he's back to his old self again and that they will still be roommates in the times to come. Sol then receives a letter from Happy, who lets Sol know that he's returning back home for good and thanks him for his hospitality, leaving him a check to pay off the rent.

Giving in to his parent's well meaning discretion, Sol takes up the family tradition of being an umpire as his day job. After successfully overseeing a youth softball game, his parents proudly pass down to him the Goode family heirloom, a golden cup protector, as proof of his maturity. Soon after, Chloe also appears on the field, and embraces Sol on the pitcher's mound. The next day, the two are in bed, but to Sol's surprise Chloe must go to work, despite it being her day off. Questioning if he's been subject to his own means of post coital removal for his one night stands, Chloe comes back into the room, revealing that she was just teasing him.

Cast
 Balthazar Getty as Sol Goode
 Katharine Towne as Chloe
 Jamie Kennedy as Justin Sax
 Danny Comden as Cooper
 Natasha Gregson Wagner as Brenda
 Cheri Oteri as Bernie "Best"
 Tori Spelling as Tammie
 Johnathon Schaech as "Happy"
 Robert Wagner as Sol's Dad
 Christina Pickles as Sol's Mom
 Jason Bateman as "Spider"
 Max Perlich as Murphy
The film features cameo appearances including Jared Leto, Carmen Electra, Jason Bateman, and Shannon Leto.

Production
The movie was originally written in 1997, eventually getting filmed three years later over a 22 day period.  Because of the tight schedule, scenes were shot largely out of sequence. The score of the film was composed by guitarist Mike Einziger, of the band Incubus.

Reception
Sol Goode was met with a mixed response upon its release, with many critics praising its cast. Vince Leo of Qwipster wrote "Sol Goode gets a recommendation as a romantic comedy, and should especially appeal to those who enjoy films about dating in LA and the wanna-be's in the Hollywood scene." He praised Comden's performance and those of rest of the cast, stating "Danny Comden, who plays Cooper in the film, also served as the film's writer and director, and for the most part, he impresses in every department. There are good performances by the hip young cast, knowing insights which bubble up throughout the story, and a good sense for the proper tone for each scene, blending in the soundtrack well." Emily Blunt wrote a similar review, stating that "the cast does a fantastic job of just enjoying the material supplied by screenwriter Danny Comden, (who also has a pivotal role in the film). There's no surprises or unforeseen twists that'll leave you mesmerized, but still it's a purrfect cuddle up with a big bowl of popcorn piece." Scott Phillips praised the cast and wrote "While Sol Goode definitely wears its adoration for John Hughes movies on its sleeve, the flick is really more akin to stuff like Swingers and even Free Enterprise."

References

External links

 
 

2001 films
2001 romantic comedy films
American romantic comedy films
Films scored by Mike Einziger
Films about actors
Films directed by Danny Comden
Films produced by Vincent Newman
2001 directorial debut films
2000s English-language films
2000s American films